State Route 412 (SR 412) is an east–west state highway in northern Ohio. The western terminus of State Route 412 is just northeast of Fremont at a diamond interchange with the U.S. Route 20/State Route 19 duplex, which follows the Fremont Bypass at that point.

Route description
State Route 412 runs exclusively within Sandusky County.  No portion of this route is incorporated in the National Highway System.

History
Making its debut in 1969, State Route 412 was designated along what was formerly the portion of State Route 12 east of Fremont.  In that year, State Route 12 was truncated back to its new eastern terminus at its junction with State Route 53 southwest of Fremont, and consequently, State Route 412 was established.

Major intersections

References

412
Transportation in Sandusky County, Ohio